Justin Kirk (born May 28, 1969) is an American actor. He is best known for portraying Prior Walter in Mike Nichols's screen adaptation of Angels in America, for which he was nominated for the Primetime Emmy Award for Outstanding Supporting Actor in a Miniseries or a Movie, losing to costar Jeffrey Wright. Kirk is also known for his portrayal of Andy Botwin on the series Weeds.

Early years
Kirk was born in Salem, Oregon. His mother was of Russian-Jewish descent and his father was of Danish and English ancestry.

Kirk grew up in Union, Washington, where he attended a grade school on a Native American reservation, until his family moved to Minneapolis, Minnesota, when he was 12 years old. He attended high school there and performed at Children's Theatre Company. He moved to New York City after graduating. Kirk played guitar in several New York bands in the early 1990s, most notably The Dimestore Darlings. He completed a two-year conservatory acting program at Circle in the Square Theatre School.

Career
His first role on Broadway was a play called Any Given Day, which was performed at the Longacre Theatre. He appeared in Love! Valour! Compassion! both in the film and in the original stage version – for which he received an Obie Award for Distinguished Performance in the Ensemble. He also appeared in Other Desert Cities with Stockard Channing, Judith Light, and Stacy Keach. He won a Backstage West Garland Award for Outstanding Performance for his role as a piano prodigy in Old Wicked Songs, staged at New York's Promenade Theater and Los Angeles' Geffen Playhouse.

Kirk's other films include Flannel Pajamas, Chapter Zero, The Eden Myth, Puccini for Beginners, and Call o' the Glen. He made his television series debut in Jack & Jill. He starred as Andy Botwin on the Showtime television series Weeds alongside former Angels in America co-star Mary-Louise Parker.

In 2017 Kirk starred in the procedural drama APB, which was cancelled by Fox after its first season.

Filmography

Film

Television

Stage

Awards and nominations

References

External links
 
 
 

1969 births
20th-century American male actors
21st-century American male actors
American male film actors
American male stage actors
American male television actors
American male voice actors
American people of Danish descent
American people of English descent
American people of Russian-Jewish descent
Circle in the Square Theatre School alumni
Jewish American male actors
Living people
Male actors from Salem, Oregon
Obie Award recipients
21st-century American Jews